Half Alive (stylized as half•alive or h•a) is an American band from Long Beach, California. The band was formed in 2016 and consists of lead singer Josh Taylor, drummer Brett Kramer and bassist J. Tyler Johnson. The trio are best known for their single "Still Feel" and its choreographed music video. Their first EP, 3, was released in 2017, while their debut studio album, Now, Not Yet, was released on August 9, 2019.

History

2016–2017: Formation and debut EP 
Josh Taylor had previously been lead singer for "The Moderates", a band from Long Beach, California. The band released their debut EP Colour in 2013. In November 2015, Taylor announced that he had embarked on a seven-month songwriting program several months prior during which he hoped to write 50 songs, a project that would eventually end on December 30. Brett Kramer, who Taylor knew as they attended the same non-denominational church, joined him on the project. The duo decided to form a band in 2016 while "watching the songs evolve as [they] were working together."

It was announced that The Moderates had disbanded on April 10, 2017, due to other commitments, but an EP as well as a new music video would be released by Taylor's new band, "Half Alive". The band's first single, "The Fall", was released on April 24 of that year alongside its music video. Their debut EP, 3, was released on the same day. It was recorded with the help of James Krausse inside a helicopter hangar in the Mojave Desert which had been converted to a recording studio. A behind the scenes video for "The Fall" was uploaded onto the band's YouTube channel in July. "Aawake at Night", the second single from the EP, was released on November 6. The three songs from the EP collectively amassed 4 million streams on Spotify in July 2018 and currently have over 95 million as of November 2021. Soon after the EP's release, the duo added a new member to their band, bassist J. Tyler Johnson, who Kramer met while performing at various music festivals at university, and together entered and won a jazz competition with during this time, while Johnson had been introduced to Taylor through the former's brother. This was done to avoid using computer-generated sounds in their songs and live performances in favor of live instruments.

2018–2020: Success with "Still Feel", major label signing and Now, Not Yet 

On August 3, 2018, the band released the single "Still Feel", accompanied by a music video filmed at Popsicle LA. The video attracted attention for its choreography and cinematography, done by lead singer Josh Taylor and JA Collective, and received positive reviews from publications including Alternative Press and Rock Sound, the former calling the cinematography "first-class" and the latter calling the band "so multi-talented". NPR also featured the track on the "All Songs Considered" playlist and directed praise at its music video, while Triple J placed it on their "Best New Music" list, expressing similar sentiments. Thanks to the attention received by the track, the band signed a record deal with RCA Records soon after. The band subsequently performed their first live show in October 2018 at the Moroccan Lounge in Los Angeles. They embarked on their first tour from January to February 2019, taking place in the United States, Canada and the United Kingdom. Soon after the release of "Still Feel", the band disclosed that they were recording two new songs that they had previously performed live, but declined to reveal when they would be released.

On January 18, 2019, the band released the single "Arrow" and a music video premiered later that day. Time named it one of the best songs of the week, writing that "the song is filled with small surprises, like mini drum breaks and a groovy synth sequence that break it up into an unexpected composition that pulses with fresh energy." After the release of the single, the band disclosed to Rock Sound that they were working "on a larger body of work but keeping it discreet and mysterious." The following month, the band's track "Still Feel" entered the Hot Rock Songs and Alternative Songs chart in the United States and eventually peaked at number 26 on the former and number 21 on the latter. On March 14, the band made their late-night television debut as they played the track on Jimmy Kimmel Live!. The performance was well received by Billboard, calling it "spectacularly orchestrated," and Rolling Stone, who deemed it "cleverly choreographed." The band then announced a world tour taking place from June to November in Australia, North America and Europe.

On April 25, the trio announced on social media that they would be releasing all of their released material on a vinyl record named *7, which also includes an intro track and an unreleased song named "Runaway". On June 13, the band released the track "Runaway" as a single alongside a heavily choreographed music video, simultaneously announcing that their debut studio album, Now, Not Yet, would be released on August 9. They performed the track live for Vevo's DSCVR series alongside "Arrow" and incorporated various dance interludes from their music videos in the renditions. The album's fourth single, "Pure Gold", which was produced by Ariel Rechtshaid, was released on July 19 alongside a "colorful and jubilant" visual. A fifth single titled "OK OK?" was premiered on July 31 at 10 AM PST on Zane Lowe's Beats 1 show as that day's "World Record". A music video for the song also shared that day.

The band released an EP titled "In Florescence" on May 1, 2020, which features orchestral reimaginings of four songs off Now, Not Yet. The EP was accompanied by a documentary titled "Now, Not Yet: in Florescence" that was released on Youtube on May 4.

2021–present: Give Me Your Shoulders, Pt. 1 & Conditions of a Punk 

On March 10, 2021, the band announced that they will be performing at the 2021 Life Is Beautiful Music & Art Festival in September of that year.  On March 24, they announced the release of a new single titled "What's Wrong", which was released the following week on March 31 alongside a music video. They further confirmed that it would serve as the first single from their upcoming second album. "What's Wrong" was a collaboration with production duo Ojivolta. A second single, "Time 2", was released on May 26.

On June 26, it was announced that the band would accompany Twenty One Pilots during the Takeover Tour as an opening act. This marked the band's first time playing a live show since the conclusion of the Now, Not Yet Tour in November 2019. The band released a third single, titled "Summerland", on July 23. The music video for "Summerland" stars actress Fivel Stewart. The fourth single, "Make of It", was released on September 16.

On November 17, the band announced a North American "Give Me Your Shoulders Tour", set to begin in February 2022. The announcement promised more throughout the week. This promise was kept true with the release of "Hot Tea" on November 18, along with an accompanying music video the next day. Unlike their past songs, "Hot Tea" features distorted vocals and trap inspired hi-hats.

"Hot Tea" was accompanied by the formal announcement of what was originally planned to be the band's sophomore album, Give Me Your Shoulders. The album was revealed as a two part record, the first of which—Give Me Your Shoulders, Pt. 1—was released on February 11, 2022, preceding the tour across North America, the United Kingdom and Europe.

On September 12, 2022, the band announced the cancellation of Give Me Your Shoulders, Pt. 2 in favor of "something beyond it". The band began what they described as a "new era" with the release of a spoken word track, "Night Swims (poem)" the same day. On September 14, the band began teasing the release of a new single titled "Did I Make You Up?". It was released on October 13, 2022, with its music video ending with the announcement of the release of their second album, Conditions of a Punk, on December 2, 2022. The track list for Conditions of a Punk features every track from Give Me Your Shoulders, Pt. 1. "Time 2" and "Night Swims (poem)" do not appear on either album. The day before the album release, the band also announced its accompanying tour, set to take place across North America, the UK, and Europe in early 2023.

Musical style and influences 
The band's musical style has been described as indie pop, pop, alternative rock, dance-pop, electronic rock and electropop, and further incorporates elements of R&B, funk and soul. The band have explained that they enjoy experimenting with numerous genres as well as sounds from 1960's, 70's and contemporary music. They have cited film and psychology, specifically Jungian and Freudian concepts from which the band's name derives, as some of their influences, in addition to the work of Sufjan Stevens, Vulfpeck, Christine and the Queens, Kimbra, Emily King, Chance the Rapper, Tyler, the Creator and Twenty One Pilots, and incorporate themes of anxiety and religion in their songs. Taylor, in an interview with NBHAP, illustrated that while songwriting he aims to hit the "sweet spot" between "abstract" and "relatable" lyrics in order to allow listeners to interpret them in their own way.

Band members 
 Joshua William "Josh" Taylor – lead vocals (2016–present)
 Brett Kramer – drums (2016–present)
 J. Tyler Johnson – bass guitar (2017–present)

Discography

Albums

Studio albums

Compilation albums

Extended plays

Singles

Notes

References 

2016 establishments in California
Musical groups established in 2016
Musical trios
RCA Records artists
Indie pop groups from California
Alternative rock groups from California
Electropop groups
American electronic rock musical groups
Dance-pop groups